Darcy Fort (born 6 August 1993) is an Australian rules footballer playing for the  in the Australian Football League (AFL). A 2.04-metre ruckman who can also play as a key forward, he played in several state leagues before being drafted by Geelong as a mature-age recruit. He made his AFL debut in round 9 of the 2019 season.

Junior and state-league career 
From Geelong, Victoria, Fort originally played for South Barwon as a junior and represented the Geelong Falcons in the TAC Cup. Ahead of the 2012 AFL draft he was little-noticed by recruiters until a match with South Barwon in the Geelong Football League, when he rucked competitively against Brad Ottens, a triple-premiership player for Geelong, despite his size and experience deficit. Over his 10 TAC Cup matches for the season, Fort averaged 10 disposals, 3.5 marks, 26 hitouts and 3.4 tackles; the Herald Sun reported that he was regarded as among the best ruckmen in the competition, highlighted Fort's tackling, tenacity and follow-up effort as strengths, and predicted he would be drafted in the late second or early third round (pick 40–50).

Fort was nevertheless overlooked at the 2012 draft (a snub the Geelong Advertiser called "inexplicable") and entered a stint in the Victorian Football League (VFL) with Werribee. He played four matches of the 2013 season before moving to Footscray. Fort played eleven matches and kicked eight goals over the next two years, then switched to South Australian National Football League club Central District ahead of the 2016 season. At this point, he was playing as a ruckman with stints as a key defender.

Over the next three years, Fort kicked 29 goals in 52 games as he began to take on a forward-line role. Fox Sports claimed he "might be the best mature-age ruck prospect in Australia" after he averaged 31.5 hitouts for Central District in 2018; journalist Callum Twomey also highlighted Fort as a possible selection in the 2018 AFL draft.

AFL career 

Fort was drafted by Geelong with pick 65 in the 2018 national draft, quitting his job as a civil engineer to play for the club. He followed Orren Stephenson (2011) and Ryan Abbott (2016) as mature-age ruckmen selected by the club. Fort began his time with Geelong competing with Abbott, Rhys Stanley and Zac Smith for the ruckman position. The proliferation of ruckmen led to him spending more time as a key forward in Geelong's VFL reserves, where he kicked eight goals in four matches and displayed strong marking ability while rucking alongside Abbott. He notched 17 hitouts and kicked three goals in combination with Abbott. He played two more matches to complete the 2019 season.

Statistics
Updated to the end of the 2022 season.

|-
| 2019 ||  || 28
| 3 || 5 || 0 || 16 || 7 || 23 || 6 || 5 || 37 || 1.7 || 0.0 || 5.3 || 2.3 || 7.7 || 2.0 || 1.7 || 12.3
|-
| 2020 ||  || 28
| 5 || 1 || 0 || 31 || 16 || 47 || 9 || 9 || 107 || 0.2 || 0.0 || 6.2 || 3.2 || 9.4 || 1.8 || 1.8 || 21.4
|-
| 2021 ||  || 32
| 0 || – || – || – || – || – || – || – || – || – || – || – || – || – || – || – || –
|- 
| 2022 ||  || 32
| 18 || 9 || 1 || 127 || 49 || 176 || 31 || 37 || 306 || 0.5 || 0.1 || 7.1 || 2.7 || 9.8 || 1.7 || 2.1 || 17.0
|- class=sortbottom
! colspan=3 | Career
! 26 !! 15 !! 1 !! 174 !! 72 !! 246 !! 46 !! 51 !! 450 !! 0.6 !! 0.0 !! 6.7 !! 2.8 !! 9.5 !! 1.8 !! 2.0 !! 17.3
|}

Notes

References

External links 

Living people
1993 births
Australian rules footballers from Geelong
South Barwon Football Club players
Geelong Falcons players
Werribee Football Club players
Footscray Football Club (VFA) players
Central District Football Club players
Geelong Football Club players
Brisbane Lions players